The following are the youth world records in Olympic weightlifting. They are the best results set in competition by athletes aged 13 to 17 throughout the entire calendar year of the performance. Records are maintained in each weight class for the snatch, clean and jerk, and the total for both by the International Weightlifting Federation (IWF).

Current records
Key to tables:

Men

Women

Historical records

Men (1998–2018)

Women (1998–2018)

References
General
Youth World Records – Men 20 July 2022 updated
Youth World Records – Women 17 July 2022 updated
Specific

External links 
 International Weightlifting Federation

Weightlifting
World, youth
Under-17 sport